Mark Taddiken (January 27, 1950) is a former Republican member of the Kansas Senate, representing the 21st district from 2001 until 2013. He has also been a member of the Clay County Extension Council since 1997.

Committee assignments
Taddiken serves on these legislative committees:
 Agriculture (chair)
 Joint Committee on Energy and Environmental Policy
 Financial Institutions and Insurance
 Natural Resources
 Utilities
 Ways and Means

Major donors
Some of the top contributors to Taddiken's 2008 campaign, according to the National Institute on Money in State Politics:
 Kansas Republican Senatorial Committee, Kansas Contractors Association, QC Holdings, Kansas Association of Realtors, Senate Republican Leadership Committee of Kansas

Financial, insurance and real estate companies were his largest donor group, followed by political parties.

References

External links
Kansas Senate
Project Vote Smart profile
 Follow the Money campaign contributions
 2000, 2002, 2004, 2006, 2008
 Taddiken on State Surge

Republican Party Kansas state senators
Living people
1950 births
21st-century American politicians
Fort Hays State University alumni